Silas Silvius Njiru (10 October 1928 – 28 April 2020) was a Kenyan Roman Catholic bishop.

Njiru was born in Kenya and was ordained to the priesthood in 1955. He served as titular bishop of Maturba and auxiliary bishop of the Diocese of Meru, Kenya, in 1975 and 1976. Njiru then served as bishop of the Meru Diocese from 1976 to 2004.

Death
Njiru died on 28 April 2020, in Rivoli, Piedmont, Italy, from COVID-19 during the COVID-19 pandemic in Italy.

Notes

1928 births
2020 deaths
20th-century Roman Catholic bishops in Kenya
Deaths from the COVID-19 pandemic in Piedmont
21st-century Roman Catholic bishops in Kenya
Roman Catholic bishops of Meru
Kenyan Roman Catholic bishops